is a Japanese manga series written and illustrated by Seiki Tsuchida. It was serialized in Shogakukan's seinen manga magazine Weekly Big Comic Spirits from 1993 to 1997, with its chapters collected in 16 tankōbon volumes. It was adapted into a television drama series broadcast on Fuji TV in 2000.

Plot
The series follows , an ex-boxer who was forced to withdraw from the sport after 15 years due to a retinal detachment. He started working part-time at the editorial department of the magazine Weekly Young Shout, at the recommendation of his childhood friend, . Momoi's unconventional and passionate personality causes many troubles, but he motivates the surrounding manga artists and fellow editors due to his earnestness and sincerity.

Media

Manga
Shogakukan collected its chapters in sixteen tankōbon volumes, released from May 30, 1994, to December 19, 1997.

Drama
An 11-episode television drama adaptation was broadcast on Fuji TV from October 10 to December 19, 2000.

Reception
Writer Frederik L. Schodt reviewed the series in his book Dreamland Japan: Writings on Modern Manga. Schodt noted that, while in reality, manga editors rarely get credit; "may even be hated by those they help", the series portrays them in a "highly sympathetic light." He also highlighted the use of "melodrama, comedy, and gags to spice up its somewhat informational approach", and praised Tsuchida's realistic artwork, adding as well that the series is "a wonderful way to learn about terminology and slang in the giant manga subculture," noting how Tsuchida provided footnotes for terms used by editors in the manga process. Writer and translator  praised the series as well, and in comparing it to other works about manga creation, like Bakuman, which "romanticizes the creation of manga and forget, to a certain extent, the most sordid parts", Henshū Ō, on the other hand, invites to reflect about "what commercial manga is and how it should be or not be" in a "crude and curiously realistic way."

Manga artist  named Henshū Ō as one of their influences.

See also
 Onaji Tsuki wo Miteiru , another manga series by Seiki Tsuchida
 Yomawari Sensei, another manga series illustrated by Seiki Tsuchida

References

Further reading

External links
 

Fuji TV dramas
Drama anime and manga
Manga creation in anime and manga
Seinen manga
Shogakukan manga